Tacony Corporation is a manufacturer and wholesale distributor of vacuum cleaners, sewing machines, ceiling fans, and commercial floor care equipment based in the St. Louis suburb of Fenton, Missouri. The family-owned and operated business, whose products are sold through a vast network of independent dealers, employs over 650 people in twelve offices worldwide.

History
In 1946, mechanic Nick Tacony began selling and servicing sewing machines from the basement of his home. In the 1950s, he expanded his business by wholesaling sewing parts, accessories and other merchandise to retailers in the Midwest.

Over the next two decades, the business grew with the acquisition of two important competitors on the East Coast. Each added to the Tacony network of distribution centers and increased the organization’s customer base.

After completing his college degree in business administration and four years in the United States Air Force, Ken Tacony joined his father's business in 1970.  He became CEO in 1984 and has overseen the company's growth into one of the largest American distributors of sewing machines, ceiling fans, vacuum cleaners, and commercial floor care products.

In 1997, Tacony Corporation transferred vacuum cleaner production from Taiwan to St. James, Missouri.  Over one million upright vacuums for home and commercial use have been produced at the Tacony Manufacturing factory in St. James.

In 2003, Tacony Corporation acquired Nancy's Notions, a sewing accessories company founded by TV Host Nancy Zieman.

See also
 List of sewing machine brands

References

External links
 Tacony brands:
 Baby Lock
 Riccar
 Simplicity
 Carpet Pro
 Powr-Flite

Home appliance manufacturers of the United States
Conglomerate companies of the United States
Sewing machine brands
Vacuum cleaner manufacturers
Manufacturing companies based in Missouri
Companies based in St. Louis County, Missouri
American companies established in 1946
Conglomerate companies established in 1946
Manufacturing companies established in 1946
1946 establishments in Missouri
American brands